Big Island Mainland 93 is a First Nations reserve of the Anishnaabeg of Naongashiing located near Lake of the Woods in Ontario.

External links
 Aboriginal Affairs and Northern Development Canada profile

References

Anishinaabe reserves in Ontario
Communities in Rainy River District